Gorgyra afikpo, the large leaf sitter, is a butterfly in the family Hesperiidae. It is found in Senegal, Sierra Leone, Ivory Coast, Ghana, Nigeria, Cameroon, the Republic of the Congo, the Central African Republic, Uganda and north-western Tanzania. The habitat consists of forests.

The larvae feed on Connarus thonningii and Dichapetalum guineense.

References

Butterflies described in 1909
Erionotini